In computability theory, many reducibility relations (also called reductions, reducibilities, and notions of reducibility) are studied.

The study of reducibility notions is motivated by the study of decision problems. For many notions of reducibility, if any noncomputable set is reducible to a set  then  must also be noncomputable.  This gives a powerful technique for proving that many sets are noncomputable.

Reducibility relations
A reducibility relation is a binary relation on sets of natural numbers that is 
 Reflexive:  Every set is reducible to itself.
These two properties imply that reducibility is a preorder on the powerset of the natural numbers. Not all preorders are studied as reducibility notions, however. The different reducibility relations vary in the methods they permit such a conversion process to use.

Degrees of a reducibility relation 

Every reducibility relation (in fact, every preorder) induces an equivalence relation on the powerset of the natural numbers in which two sets are equivalent if and only if each one is reducible to the other.  In computability theory, these equivalence classes are called the degrees of the reducibility relation.  For example, the Turing degrees are the equivalence classes of sets of naturals induced by Turing reducibility. 

The degrees of any reducibility relation are partially ordered by the relation in the following manner. Let  be a reducibility relation and let  and  be two of its degrees. It is common, as shown here, to use boldface notation to denote degrees.

Turing reducibility 

The most fundamental reducibility notion is Turing reducibility. Equivalently,  is Turing reducible to  if and only if there is an algorithm for computing the indicator function for  provided that the algorithm is provided with a means to correctly answer questions of the form "Is  in ?". 

Turing reducibility serves as a dividing line for other reducibility notions because, according to the Church-Turing thesis, it is the most general reducibility relation that is effective.  Reducibility relations that imply Turing reducibility have come to be known as strong reducibilities, while those that are implied by Turing reducibility are weak reducibilities.   Equivalently, a strong reducibility relation is one whose degrees form a finer equivalence relation than the Turing degrees, while a weak reducibility relation is one whose degrees form a coarser equivalence relation than Turing equivalence.

Reductions stronger than Turing reducibility 
The strong reducibilities include
Truth-table reducible:  is truth-table reducible to  if  is Turing reducible to  via a single (oracle) Turing machine which produces a total function relative to every oracle.
Disjunctive reducible: Similar to positive reducible with the additional constraint that only or's are permitted.
Conjunctive reducibility: Similar to positive reducibility with the additional constraint that only and's are permitted.
Linear reducibility: Similar to positive reducibility but with the constraint that all atoms of the form  are combined by exclusive or's.
Many of these were introduced by Post (1944). Post was searching for a non-computable, computably enumerable set which the halting problem could not be Turing reduced to. As he could not construct such a set in 1944, he instead worked on the analogous problems for the various reducibilities that he introduced. These reducibilities have since been the subject of much research, and many relationships between them are known.

Bounded reducibilities 
A bounded form of each of the above strong reducibilities can be defined. The most famous of these is bounded truth-table reduction, but there are also bounded Turing, bounded weak truth-table, and others. These first three are the most common ones and they are based on the number of queries. The difference between bounded weak truth-table and bounded Turing reduction is that in the first case, the up to  queries have to be made at the same time while in the second case, the queries can be made one after the other.

Strong reductions in computational complexity 

The strong reductions listed above restrict the manner in which oracle information can be accessed by a decision procedure but do not otherwise limit the computational resources available.  Thus if a set  is decidable then  is reducible to any set  under any of the strong reducibility relations listed above, even if  is not polynomial-time or exponential-time decidable.   This is acceptable in the study of computability theory, which is interested in theoretical computability, but it is not reasonable for computational complexity theory, which studies which sets can be decided under certain asymptotical resource bounds.  

This reducibility is, essentially, a resource-bounded version of many-one reducibility. Other resource-bounded reducibilities are used in other contexts of computational complexity theory where other resource bounds are of interest.

Reductions weaker than Turing reducibility 
Although Turing reducibility is the most general reducibility that is effective, weaker reducibility relations are commonly studied.  These reducibilities are related to the relative definability of sets over arithmetic or set theory. They include:
The arithmetical hierarchy gives a finer classification of arithmetical reducibility. 

References 
 K. Ambos-Spies and P. Fejer, 2006. "Degrees of Unsolvability." Unpublished preprint.
 P. Odifreddi, 1989. Classical Recursion Theory, North-Holland. 
 P. Odifreddi, 1999. Classical Recursion Theory, Volume II, Elsevier. 
E. Post, 1944, "Recursively enumerable sets of positive integers and their decision problems", Bulletin of the American Mathematical Society, volume 50, pages 284–316.
 H. Rogers, Jr., 1967. The Theory of Recursive Functions and Effective Computability, second edition 1987, MIT Press.  (paperback), 
 G. Sacks, 1990.  Higher Recursion Theory, Springer-Verlag.

Internet Resources 

Stanford Encyclopedia of Philosophy: Recursive Functions